The Guodian Beilun Power Station is a coal-fired power station in Beilun District, Ningbo, Zhejiang, China. With an installed capacity of 5,000 MW, it is the 7th largest coal-fired power station in the world. (It shares this title with the Jiaxing, Guohua Taishan, and Waigaoqiao power stations). The station generates energy by five  and two  units, which is fuelled by coal. 

Guodian Beilun Power Station is also the first power generation enterprise in China to use World Bank loans for construction.

See also 

 List of coal power stations
 List of largest power stations in the world
 List of power stations in China

References 

Coal-fired power stations in China
Power stations in Zhejiang
Companies based in Ningbo